Alisi Tupuailei (born 1 February 1982) is a former professional rugby union player who played as a centre. Born in Samoa, he played internationally for the Japan national team.

Career
Tupuailei played for Canterbury in the provincial games.  He has represented Japan in both sevens and fifteens. He made his Rugby World Cup debut in 2011. He was part of the Japanese squad to the 2012 Hong Kong Sevens.

External links

Living people
Samoan rugby union players
Canterbury rugby union players
1982 births
Japan international rugby union players
Samoan expatriate rugby union players
Expatriate rugby union players in Japan
Expatriate rugby union players in New Zealand
Samoan expatriate sportspeople in New Zealand
Samoan expatriate sportspeople in Japan
Mie Honda Heat players
Japan international rugby sevens players